Hejda (feminine Hejdová) is a Czech surname. Notable people with the surname include:

Jan Hejda, Czech ice hockey player
Lukáš Hejda, Czech footballer
Romana Hejdová, Czech basketball player
Zbyněk Hejda, Czech poet
Zuzana Hejdová, Czech tennis player

Czech-language surnames